The 2019 Pacific hurricane season was an event in the annual cycle of tropical cyclone formation, in which tropical cyclones form in the eastern Pacific Ocean. The season officially started on May 15 in the eastern Pacific—east of 140°W—and June 1 in the central Pacific—between the International Date Line and 140°W, and ended on November 30. These dates conventionally delimit the period of each year when most tropical cyclones form in the eastern Pacific basin.

This timeline documents tropical cyclone formations, strengthening, weakening, landfalls, extratropical transitions, and dissipations during the season. It includes information that was not released throughout the season, meaning that data from post-storm reviews by the National Hurricane Center, such as a storm that was not initially warned upon, has been included.

By convention, meteorologists use one time zone when issuing forecasts and making observations: Coordinated Universal Time (UTC), and also use the 24-hour clock (where 00:00 = midnight UTC). Tropical cyclone advisories in the Eastern North Pacific basin use both UTC and the nautical time zone where the center of the tropical cyclone is currently located. Time zones utilized (east to west) are: Central, Mountain, Pacific and Hawaii. In this timeline, all information is listed by UTC first, with the respective regional time zone included in parentheses. Additionally, figures for maximum sustained winds and position estimates are rounded to the nearest 5 units (knots, miles, or kilometers), following National Hurricane Center practice. Direct wind observations are rounded to the nearest whole number. Atmospheric pressures are listed to the nearest millibar and nearest hundredth of an inch of mercury.

Timeline

May
May 15
 The 2019 Eastern Pacific hurricane season officially begins.

June
June 1
 The 2019 Central Pacific hurricane season officially begins.

June 25
 21:00 UTC (4:00 p.m.

June 26
 15:00 UTC (9:00 a.m.

June 28
 03:00 UTC (8:00 p.m.
 09:00 UTC (2:00 a.m.

June 29
 09:00 UTC (2:00 a.m.
 15:00 UTC (8:00 a.m.

June 30
 15:00 UTC (9:00 a.m.

July
July 1
 21:00 UTC (2:00 p.m.

July 2
 03:00 UTC (8:00 p.m.
 12:30 UTC (2:30 a.m.
July 3
03:00 UTC (5:00 p.m.
July 4
09:00 UTC (11:00 p.m.
21:00 UTC (11:00 a.m.
July 5
09:00 UTC (11:00 p.m.
15:00 UTC (5:00 a.m.
July 6
15:00 UTC (5:00 a.m.
15:00 UTC (8:00 a.m.
21:00 UTC (2:00 p.m.
July 8
03:00 UTC (8:00 p.m.
15:00 UTC (8:00 a.m.
July 12
21:00 UTC (3:00 p.m.
July 14
15:00 UTC (8:00 a.m.
July 22
09:00 UTC (2:00 p.m.
July 23
09:00 UTC (2:00 a.m.
July 24
09:00 UTC (2:00 a.m.
July 25
15:00 UTC (8:00 a.m.
July 27
15:00 UTC (5:00 a.m.
21:15 UTC (2:15 p.m.
July 28
15:00 UTC (9:00 a.m.
July 29
09:00 UTC (11:00 p.m.
July 30
03:00 UTC (5:00 p.m.
15:00 UTC (5:00 a.m.
21:00 UTC (11:00 a.m.
21:00 UTC (11:00 a.m.
July 31
03:00 UTC (5:00 p.m.
09:00 UTC (11:00 p.m.
21:00 UTC (11:00 a.m.

August
August 1
03:00 UTC (5:00 p.m.
09:00 UTC (11:00 p.m.
August 2
03:00 UTC (5:00 p.m.
August 3
15:00 UTC (8:00 a.m.
15:00 UTC (8:00 a.m.
August 4
03:00 UTC (5:00 p.m.
09:00 UTC (2:00 a.m.
August 5
03:00 UTC (8:00 p.m.
03:00 UTC (5:00 p.m.
03:00 UTC (5:00 p.m.
August 6
03:00 UTC (5:00 p.m.
August 12
03:00 UTC (9:00 p.m.
09:00 UTC (3:00 a.m.
August 13
09:00 UTC (2:00 a.m.
15:00 UTC (8:00 a.m.
August 21
15:00 UTC (9:00 a.m.
21:00 UTC (3:00 p.m.
August 23
16:00 UTC (9:00 a.m.
August 25
09:00 UTC (2:00 a.m.
21:00 UTC (2:00 p.m.

September
September 1
09:00 UTC (3:00 a.m.
September 2
21:00 UTC (3:00 p.m.
September 3
03:00 UTC (9:00 p.m.
15:00 UTC (8:00 a.m.
September 4
09:00 UTC (2:00 a.m.
15:00 UTC (5:00 a.m.
September 5
03:00 UTC (8:00 p.m.
23:00 UTC (1:00 p.m. HST) at  – Tropical Depression Twelve-E strengthens into Tropical Storm Akoni roughly  southest of Hilo, Hawaii.
September 6
15:00 UTC (5:00 p.m.
21:00 UTC (11:00 a.m.
September 7
21:00 UTC (11:00 a.m.
September 12
15:00 UTC (9:00 a.m.
21:00 UTC (3:00 p.m.
September 14
21:00 UTC (2:00 p.m.
September 15
00:30 UTC (5:30 p.m.
03:00 UTC (8:00 p.m.

October

November 
November 30	
 The 2019 Pacific hurricane season officially ends.

See also

 List of Pacific hurricanes
 Timeline of the 2019 Atlantic hurricane season
 Tropical cyclones in 2019

References

External links

 2019 Tropical Cyclone Advisory Archive, National Hurricane Center and Central Pacific Hurricane Center

2019 Pacific hurricane season
Pacific hurricane meteorological timelines
Articles which contain graphical timelines